David Murdoch (born 1978) is a Scottish curler.

David Murdoch may also refer to:

 David Murdoch (banker) (1825–1911), New Zealand banker
 David Murdoch (politician) (1887–1960), New Zealand politician
 David Murdoch MacPherson (1847–1915), Canadian manufacturer and political figure
 David Murdoch (academic), New Zealand medical researcher and academic administrator

See also
 David H. Murdock (born 1923), American businessman and philanthropist
 Murdoch (disambiguation)